Fuzzy Duck is the self-titled album by London-based progressive rock band Fuzzy Duck. When it was originally released, only 500 pressings were made, making the original vinyl LP extremely rare.

The song "Time Will Be Your Doctor" was written by Paul Francis with two of his Tucky Buzzard bandmates, Nicky Graham and David Leonard Brown. Tucky Buzzard did their own version of the song for their self-titled album.

Track listing

"Double Time Woman" released as a single in August 1971
"Big Brass Band"/"One More Hour" released as a single in November 1971
"No Name Face" previously unreleased

Personnel
Fuzzy Duck
Mick "Doc" Hawksworth – bass, vocals, 12-string acoustic guitar (7), electric cello (7)
Roy "Daze" Sharland – organ, "ducking" vocals (8), electric piano (3)
Paul Francis – drums, percussion
Grahame White – electric (1-8) and acoustic (2) guitars, vocals (1-8)
Garth Watt-Roy – electric guitar (9-12), vocals (9-12)
Technical
Keith Harwood - engineer
Jonathan Xavier Coudrille - artwork
David Reed - photography

1971 debut albums
Fuzzy Duck (band) albums
MAM Records albums
Albums recorded at Olympic Sound Studios